Begum Shamsun Nahar Ahmed (died October 2017) was a Bangladeshi politician who was elected as member of 5th Jatiya Sangsad of Reserved Seats for Women. She was a politician of Bangladesh Nationalist Party.

References

Bangladesh Nationalist Party politicians
People from Magura District
5th Jatiya Sangsad members
2017 deaths
2nd Jatiya Sangsad members
Women members of the Jatiya Sangsad
20th-century Bangladeshi women politicians